The 2014–15 Wichita State Shockers women's basketball team represents Wichita State University in the 2014–15 NCAA Division I women's basketball season. They play their home games at Charles Koch Arena, which has a capacity of 10,506. The Shockers, led by seventh year head coach Jody Adams and were members of the Missouri Valley Conference. They finish the season 29-5, 17-1 in MVC play to win the Missouri Valley Conference regular season title. They also won the Missouri Valley Conference Women's tournament to earn an automatic trip to the 2015 NCAA Division I women's basketball tournament where they lost to California in the first round.

Roster

Schedule

|-
!colspan=9 style="background:#000; color:#FFC318;"| Exhibition

|-
!colspan=9 style="background:#000; color:#FFC318;"| Regular Season

|-
!colspan=9 style="background:#000; color:#FFC318;"| Missouri Valley Tournament

|-
!colspan=9 style="background:#000; color:#FFC318;"| NCAA Women's tournament

Rankings

See also
2014–15 Wichita State Shockers men's basketball team

References

Wichita State Shockers women's basketball seasons
Wichita State
Wichita State